Lębork railway station is a railway station serving the town of Lębork, in the Pomeranian Voivodeship, Poland. The station opened in 1870 and is located on the Gdańsk–Stargard railway. The train services are operated by PKP, Przewozy Regionalne and SKM Tricity.

The town and the station used to be known as Lauenburg (Pommern) until 1945.

History
The line from Gdańsk to Słupsk reached Lębork in 1870 as a single track, standard gauge rail line. The line was electrified in 1989.
In 1899 Lębork was connection with Łeba and in 1905 with Kartuzy. This second line was closed in the period between 1920 and 1939. It was closed for good in 2000 and since 2004 the line has been unavailable for transport.
The connection with Bytów which opened in 1902 and closed in 2003.

Station buildings

The station building is an old brick building, still fully operational. The ticket office is present and working. Lębork station has two water towers and a signal box.

Modernisation
In April 2013 work began on a thorough modernisation of the railway station. The station building and surrounding area underwent complete refurbishment. The modernisation was completed in June 2014. Construction of the underground passage from platform 3 to the street behind the station is planned.

Train services
The station is served by the following services:

Express Intercity Premium services (EIP) Kołobrzeg - Gdynia - Warsaw - Kraków
 Intercity services (IC) Łódź Fabryczna — Warszawa — Gdańsk Glowny — Kołobrzeg
Intercity services (IC) Szczecin - Koszalin - Słupsk - Gdynia - Gdańsk
Intercity services (IC) Szczecin - Koszalin - Słupsk - Gdynia - Gdańsk - Elbląg/Iława - Olsztyn
Intercity services (IC) Szczecin - Koszalin - Słupsk - Gdynia - Gdańsk - Elbląg - Olsztyn - Białystok
Intercity services (TLK) Kołobrzeg — Gdynia Główna — Warszawa Wschodnia — Kraków Główny
Regional services (R) Tczew — Słupsk  
Regional services (R) Malbork — Słupsk  
Regional services (R) Elbląg — Słupsk  
Regional services (R) Słupsk — Bydgoszcz Główna 
Regional services (R) Słupsk — Gdynia Główna
Szybka Kolej Miejska services (SKM) (Lebork -) Wejherowo - Reda - Rumia - Gdynia - Sopot - Gdansk

See also
Lębork

References 

 This article is based upon a translation of the Polish language version as of October 2016.

External links

Lębork official website
Lębork ar Google Local
Photogalery of Lębork
Unofficial site of Lębork

Railway stations in Poland opened in 1870
Railway stations in Pomeranian Voivodeship
Lębork County